United States Army Steam Locomotive No. 4039 is located in the Whippany section of Hanover Township, Morris County, New Jersey, United States. The locomotive was built in 1942 and added to the National Register of Historic Places on March 4, 2002. The locomotive is part of the Whippany Railway Museum.

History
The locomotive was built by the American Locomotive Company in November 1942 for the U.S. War Department. The locomotive is an S155 class 0-6-0 "Switching"-type built for Standard gauge track. The intended use of the locomotive was for U.S. military service in the Far East, Africa and Europe, but instead was used for switching operations for military bases within the United States during World War II. After World War II the locomotive was no longer needed by the War Department and was sold to the Virginia Blue Ridge Railway on February 17, 1947. The locomotive was used in freight operations until August 1, 1963, when it was taken out of service when the Virginia Blue Ridge Railway made the change over to diesel locomotives.

In 1965, the locomotive was sold to the Morris County Central Railroad and was used for passenger rail excursions. The locomotive's last run was on December 14, 1980, between Newfoundland and Stockholm, New Jersey. The Whippany Railway Museum acquired the locomotive on May 7, 1994, and cosmetically restored it for static display. The Morris County Board of Chosen Freeholders adopted a Resolution designating the locomotive "The Official Steam Locomotive of Morris County" on January 26, 1997.

See also
National Register of Historic Places listings in Morris County, New Jersey
Southern Railway 385
Duluth and Northeastern 29
Tennessee Valley Railroad 610

References

Rail infrastructure on the National Register of Historic Places in New Jersey
4039
0-6-0 locomotives
ALCO locomotives
Railway locomotives on the National Register of Historic Places
Hanover Township, New Jersey
Individual locomotives of the United States
National Register of Historic Places in Morris County, New Jersey
New Jersey Register of Historic Places
Railway locomotives introduced in 1942
Standard gauge locomotives of the United States
Preserved steam locomotives of New Jersey